Anantkumar Hegde (born 20 May 1968) is an Indian politician, the former Union Minister of State for Skill Development and Entrepreneurship and the incumbent Member of Parliament for Uttara Kannada constituency.  Hegde is a member of the Bharatiya Janata Party (BJP). Hegde is a Hindu nationalist and a Rashtriya Swayamsevak Sangh (RSS) volunteer.

Early life
Hegde was born to Lalita and Dattatreya Hegde in Sirsi of Uttara Kannada district on 20 May 1968. He graduated from MM Arts & Science College in Sirsi. During college days he was member of Rashtriya Swayamsevak Sangh and later an ABVP activist. In 1998, Anant Kumar married Shrirupa Hegde and they have two children, a daughter and a son.

Career 
Six-time Lok Sabha member , Hegde was first elected to the 11th Lok Sabha in 1996 from Uttar Kanara seat, then re-elected in 1998. He narrowly lost in the next election in 1999 to Margaret Alva of Congress. Since then, he has been re-elected four consecutive times from Uttara Kannada (Lok Sabha constituency) from 2004 to 2009 Lok Sabha to 2019–2024.

He was appointed the Union Minister of State for Skill Development and Entrepreneurship in Prime Minister Narendra Modi's cabinet since September 2017.

Social activities 
Hegde founded Kadamba group of organisations which works in the fields of multi-dimensional socioeconomic activities for the downtrodden, weaker and the vulnerable section of the society, particularly in the rural areas.

Controversies
In January 2017, he was caught on camera assaulting and hitting a doctor for the alleged mistreatment of his mother at a hospital.

In 2018, speaking at a job fair and skill exhibition, he said that he will go ahead with his commitment of developing skills in the youth of India and not bother about the barking stray dogs, referring to groups protesting his earlier "change constitution" remark.

In 2018, he criticised the word secular and said that BJP government would "amend the Constitution" to remove the word from the Preamble.

He has claimed that Taj Mahal was originally a Shiv Mandir known as Tejo Mahalaya. After KPCC president Dinesh Gundu Rao questioned him over his achievements as a Union Minister, Hegde referred to Rao as "a guy who ran behind a Muslim lady".

In January 2019, he made a misogynistic comment against women entering the Sabarimala temple, which does not admit women, as a "daylight rape on Hindus".

In March 2019, he triggered controversy by calling the Congress president, Rahul Gandhi, a "hybrid product that can be found only in Congress laboratory". He said Gandhi claims to be a Brahmin "despite being born to a Muslim father and a Christian mother".

In September 2019, he once again triggered a controversy by calling the former IAS officer S. Sasikanth Senthil a traitor and asking him to go to Pakistan.

In February 2020, Hegde triggered another controversy by stating that the freedom fight led by Mahatma Gandhi was a drama. He attacked Gandhi by questioning how such a person be called a 'Mahatma'. He again stated that the freedom movement in India was staged with the consent and support of the British.

References

External links
Members of Fifteenth Lok Sabha – Parliament of India website

|-

|-

Living people
1968 births
India MPs 2004–2009
People from Uttara Kannada
India MPs 1996–1997
India MPs 2009–2014
India MPs 1998–1999
Lok Sabha members from Karnataka
India MPs 2014–2019
Bharatiya Janata Party politicians from Karnataka
India MPs 2019–present
Indian male taekwondo practitioners